Catholic University in Ružomberok (CU) is a public university with religious character. The Conference of Slovak Bishops and National Council of the Slovak Republic took part in its foundation in 2000. 
CU performs its activities especially in the areas of the humanities, historical, pedagogical, and social and health sciences, as well as in the areas of art, economics, management, and law. Catholic University has been the associate since 2004 and in 2010 it became the member of International Federation of Catholic Universities. University has also been the member of Fédération des Universités Catholiques Européennes (FUCE) since 2007. Since 2016 vice-rector prof. František Trstenský is member of Board of FUCE.
 
Structure

Catholic University has four faculties:
Faculty of Theology (in Košice)
Faculty of Arts and Letters
Faculty of Education
Faculty of Health

References

External links
Official site of Catholic University in Ruzomberok

Universities in Slovakia
Educational institutions established in 2000
Ružomberok
2000 establishments in Slovakia
Buildings and structures in Žilina Region